Tylko dla dorosłych (English: Only for adults) is an album released by Polish rapper O.S.T.R. on February 26, 2010. The album reached #1 on the OLiS charts.

Track listing
 "Tak To Się Zaczęło" - 1:51
 "Przez Stress" - 3:44
 "Konsumpcjonizm" - 3:17
 "Spalic Gniew" - 4:13
 "To Potrwa Sekundę" - 2:33
 "Spij Spokojnie" - 3:57
 "Walka Z Wrogiem" - 3:16
 "Nie Wszystko Co Złe" - 3:32
 "Zywy Lub Martwy" - 4:00
 "Nie Odwracając Się" - 3:27
 "Za Drugim Razem" - 2:33
 "To Nie Czas" - 3:34
 "Dowód W Twoich Rekach" - 3:45
 "Klucz Do Zagadki" - 2:49
 "Przemyśl To Sobie" - 0:42

References

2010 albums
O.S.T.R. albums
Polish-language albums